Bertholdia flavidorsata is a moth of the family Erebidae. It was described by George Hampson in 1901. It is found in Bolivia and Ecuador.

References

Phaegopterina
Moths described in 1901